Fenner may refer to:

Surname
Arthur Fenner (1745–1805), Rhode Island governor
Charles Fenner (1884–1955), Australian geologist and educator
Charles Erasmus Fenner (1834–1911), a justice of the Louisiana Supreme Court, in whose home Confederate President Jefferson Davis died in 1889
Charles Erasmus Fenner, Jr. (1876–1963), founding partner of New Orleans' Fenner & Beane, a brokerage firm which merged in 1941 to become Merrill Lynch, Pierce, Fenner & Beane
Clarence Norman Fenner (1870-1949), American petrologist
David Fenner, Scottish footballer
Dudley Fenner (c. 1558–1587), Puritan minister
Francis Fenner (1811–1896), English cricketer and founder of Cambridge University's cricket ground
Frank Fenner (1914–2010), Australian scientist
James Fenner (1771–1846), Rhode Island governor, son of Arthur
Mary Galentine Fenner (1839-1903), American poet and litterateur
Maurice Fenner (1929–2015), English cricketer
Peggy Fenner (1922–2014), British Conservative Party politician
Shelby Fenner, actress appearing in the films Wolf Girl (2001), Local Boys (2002) and The Guardian (2006)
Wilhelm Fenner (1891–after 1946), German cryptanalyst who worked as a Director of Cipher Department of the High Command of the Wehrmacht

Given name
Fenner Brockway (1888–1988), British politician
Fenner Kimball, American politician

Places
Fenner Hall, a hall of residence at The Australian National University in Canberra, ACT.
Division of Fenner, electoral division for Australian federal parliament
Fenner, California
Fenner, New York

Companies
Fenner (company), a British-based manufacturer of industrial belting